Syneta adamsi is a species of beetles from the family of leaf beetles, subfamily Synetinae.

Distribution
Syneta adamsi is found in China, Japan and Russia — in Khabarovsk Krai, Sakhalin of the Kuril Islands, Amur regions, and the Primorsky Krai.

Description
At length the beetle reaches 7.4 mm. The epipleuron is flat, with a number of points at the inner edge. The elytra of females have a long lateral keel. The top of the aedeagus has a short process.

References

Further reading
 

Synetinae
Beetles described in 1877
Taxa named by Joseph Sugar Baly